Mario David Quiroz Villón (born September 8, 1982 in Guayaquil) is an Ecuadorian Association footballer.

Club career
Quiroz started at El Nacional. He was a starter in the Copa Sudamericana 2007 and in the 2007 Copa Libertadores.

In January 2008, he signed a contract for the successful Ecuadorian Barcelona. He recently has had excellent performances with his new club. He was a regular starter for head coach, Reinaldo Merlo.

In January 2009 Quiroz signed with Emelec for three years.

On 10 December 2011 Quiroz was transferred to Mexico club Atlante FC.

In January 2012, he was on loan with LDU Quito for one year.

International career
Quiroz is seen as a promising player; he has played for the Ecuador national team and made his beginning appearances against Sweden. His next international appearance was in a friendly against Ireland in the Giants Stadium, New York City. He had no play for the Copa América 2007 for Ecuador. He has seen playing time so far in Ecuador's 2010 World Cup qualifying tournament, starting in the 5-1 win over Peru in Quito.

Honors

Club
El Nacional
Ecuadorian Serie A: 2005 Clausura, 2006

References
 Ecuador names Copa América squad
 Ecuador v. Ireland match

External links

 David Quiroz at Footballzz
https://www.youtube.com/watch?v=CEbLzx-v0ns

1982 births
Living people
Sportspeople from Guayaquil
Ecuadorian footballers
Ecuadorian expatriate footballers
Ecuador international footballers
C.D. El Nacional footballers
Barcelona S.C. footballers
C.S. Emelec footballers
Atlante F.C. footballers
L.D.U. Quito footballers
S.D. Quito footballers
C.D. Olmedo footballers
Expatriate footballers in Mexico
2007 Copa América players
2011 Copa América players
Association football midfielders
Ecuadorian Serie A players
Liga MX players